Glycomyces paridis is a bacterium from the genus of Glycomyces which has been isolated from the roots of the plant Paris polyphylla var. yunnanensis from Xishuangbanna in China.

References 

Actinomycetia
Bacteria described in 2018